The following human polls make up the 2010 NCAA Division I men's baseball rankings.  The USAToday/ESPN poll is voted on by a panel of 31 Division I baseball coaches.  The Baseball America poll is voted on by staff members of the Baseball America magazine.

Legend

ESPN/USA Today Coaches' Poll

Baseball America Poll

Collegiate Baseball Poll

NCBWA

References

 
College baseball rankings in the United States